Darreh Saki-ye Olya (also Romanized as Darreh Sākī-ye ‘Olyā; also known as Darreh Sākī and Darreh Sāqī) is a village in Dehpir-e Shomali Rural District, in the Central District of Khorramabad County, Lorestan Province, Iran. At the 2006 census, its population was 155, in 37 families.

References 

Towns and villages in Khorramabad County